Flustrellidra hispida is a species of colonial bryozoan in the order Ctenostomatida.

Encrusting colonies are loosely attached to substrata, forming thick, lobed, brown to yellowish patches with a “furry” appearance due to dense spines. Colonies comprise sterile and protandrous hermaphrodite zooids incubating non-feeding pseudocyphonautes larva in the modified tentacle sheath. 

Flustrellidra hispida is an amphiboreal species, widely distributed in the northern Atlantic. They live in a temperate climate and prefer a water temperature not exceeding 15 ° C and normal salinity.

References 

Ctenostomatida